Bitterlich is a German surname. Notable people with the surname include:

Don Bitterlich (born 1954), American football player
Eduard Bitterlich (1833–1872), Austrian painter
Hans Bitterlich (1860–1949), Austrian sculptor
Walter Bitterlich (1908–2008), Austrian scientist

German-language surnames